Mengly J. Quach Education is parent company of Aii Language Center (Aii) and American Intercon School (AIS) founded in 2005 by Mengly J. Quach.

History
In 2005, Mengly J. Quach founded The Mengly J. Quach Education. Its Aii Language Center and American Intercon School, engage in education, health care, food, media and financial services. It started with only 20 students in 2005 and by 2019, his educational programs had grown from a single classroom with just four students into one of Cambodia's biggest educational networks, with fifteen school buildings, over 18,000 students, more than 1,800 staff and boasts 55,000 alumni. 

As Mengly J. Quach Education grows, the purpose of MJQE is to empower its students to achieve their educational and career goals. MJQE is a provider of educational services and the parent company of American Intercon Schools System, Aii Language Centers System, Study Overseas Go Overseas (SOGO) and i-Learn. These institutions offer a wide array of programs ranging from Pre-Kindergarten to university research programs. The primary goal is to provide high value to the education sector in Cambodia.

Awards
 The SME One Asia Awards 2012 in the Overseas Enterprise Award in Singapore
 The 9th TAYO ASEAN Award (Ten Accomplished Youth Organizations Award) by TAYO AWARDS Foundation Inc. in Bandar Seri Begawan, Brunei Darussalam, in 2014
 The Education Partnership Leader Award by Worlddidac in 2015 Worlddidac Conference in Hong Kong, China
 Excellent Program Award 2018 by the Securities and Exchange Commission of Cambodia
 The Winner of SME Excellence – Corporate Social Responsibility Award 2018 in Singapore

References

External links 
 Mengly J. Quach Education * Official Website

Companies based in Phnom Penh